Prem Joshua is a German-Indian musician, active since 1991.

Born in Germany in 
1958, Joshua learned the flute at the age of five and played the flute and the saxophone for various local bands. At the age of 18, he traveled overland to India studying the indigenous folk music of countries along the way. Joshua was the name his parents gave him, he later added Prem to it, dropping the family name, to remind him of the essence of love (Prem means love in Hindi).

On reaching India, Joshua learned to play the sitar from Ustad Usman Khan. Osho inspired him and his music. His website states that "In the presence of this man with a long white beard, eyes as deep as the ocean and a strong sense of humor, he came in touch with the art of the “inner music” - Silence. This was really coming home!"

Throughout his career, he has experimented with various forms of music, creating a blend of the East and the West. He has also worked extensively with other producers, making remixes of his own songs and infusing traditional Hindustani acoustic instruments with lounge and trance beats. His music has immensely contributed to the Asian Underground and fusion scene.

In 1991, Joshua launched his first project, “Terra Incognita”, with Kora player, Ravi, and British Sarod player, Chinmaya Dunster, with which he released two albums. He subsequently released four solo albums and formed the band, “Hamsafar”, with which he released one album. Following this, Joshua began to experiment with genres like drum and bass, lounge, and trance, while still focusing on traditional Hindustani music.

Hamsafar Band members
Prem Joshua — sitar, bamboo flutes, soprano saxophone, vocals
Raul Sengupta — tabla, darbouka, cajon, percussion, laptops, vocals
Satgyan Fukuda — electric bass, percussion, vocals
Dondieu Divin — keyboards
Sukriti Sen — vocalist

Discography
 No Goal But The Path - with Terra Incognita, New Earth Records, 1991
 Tribal Gathering - with Terra Incognita, New Earth Records, 1992
 Tales of a Dancing River - New Earth Records, 1993
 Hamsafar - New Earth Records, 1994
 Desert Visions - New Earth Records, 1995
 Secret of the Wind - New Earth Records, 1996
 Mudra - White Swan Records, 1998
 Sky Kisses Earth - White Swan Records, 1999
 Dance of Shakti - White Swan Records, 2001
 Water Down The Ganges - with Manish Vyas, Medial Music, 2001
 Shiva Moon - Prem Joshua Remixed by Maneesh de Moor - Medial Music, 2003
 Dakini Lounge - Prem Joshua Remixed - White Swan Records, 2003
 Yatri - Medial Music, 2004
 Ahir - with Chintan, Medial Music, 2006
 Taranga - White Swan Records, 2006
 In Concert, 2008 
 Prem Joshua & Band In Concert [LIVE] - White Swan Records, 2009
 Luminous Secrets - Link to Album on Official Website, 2010
 "Kashi: Songs from the India Within" , 2014 
 Breath of Voavah, 2017
 Winds of Grace - Link to Album on www.spotify.com, 2020

Sources
Prem Joshua - Albums
White Swan Records - Featured Artists - Prem Joshua
[ Allmusic]

References

External links
 Prem Joshua - Official Website
 New Earth Records - Official Website
 White Swan Records - Official Website
 Trident Entertainment - Official Website
 Prem Joshua's LastFM Site

German male musicians
Sitar players
Living people
Rajneesh movement
Year of birth missing (living people)